Osteochilus microcephalus is a cyprinid freshwater fish from Southeast Asia.

Distribution and habitat
Osteochilus microcephalus is found in the Salween, Mae Klong, Chao Phraya, and Mekong River basins, as well as in Peninsular Malaysia, Sumatra, and Borneo. It inhabits lowland freshwater wetlands, canals, and other artificial habitats, and also moves into flooded forests, grasslands, and fields. It is locally common and fished in small-scale fisheries.

Description
Osteochilus microcephalus has a broad black mid-lateral stripe running to the caudal fin base. It grows to  SL.

References

Osteochilus
Fish of the Mekong Basin
Fauna of Brunei
Fish of Cambodia
Freshwater fish of Indonesia
Freshwater fish of Malaysia
Fish of Laos
Fish of Thailand
Fish of Vietnam
Freshwater fish of Borneo
Freshwater fish of Sumatra
Taxa named by Achille Valenciennes
Fish described in 1842